Pink disease can refer to:

Acrodynia, a condition caused by mercury poisoning, also known as pink disease
Erythricium salmonicolor, a fungal plant pathogen causing pink disease in many commercial fruit trees